Rachael Vanderwal (born 27 June 1983) is a 5'9 (1.75m) former point guard for Great Britain women's national basketball team. She was part of the squad for the 2012 Summer Olympics and part of the England squad that took silver at the 2018 Commonwealth Games. She has dual citizenship with Great Britain and Canada.

Rachael grew up in Hamilton, Ontario Canada.  She figure skated until the age of 12, when she took up the sport of basketball.  She played for Bishop Ryan Secondary School in Hamilton winning the provincial championship her final year in 2001.  She played for Boston University in the NCAA Division 1 from 2002-2006 in the America East Conference.  She captained the squad her sophomore, junior and senior years.  As a freshman, BU won the America East and went to the NCAA tournament, playing the national champions University of Connecticut in the first round. She received All-Conference first team and All-Defensive team her senior year. She remains in the career top ten in minutes played.

Rachael has played professionally in the Irish Superleague from 2007-2014.  Her first two seasons where with Donoughmore, Cork where she won National Cup and League Titles and Player of the Year back to back.  In 2009, she transferred to the University of Limerick where she led the league in scoring.  The UL huskies have dominated the Irish Superleague in recent years winning 4 regular season titles, 3 national cups and 3 league playoffs from 2010-2014, with Rachael playing a dominant role.  Rachael won Player of the Year three years in a row from 2011-2013.

She then moved on to playing professionally in the top Liga Femenina in Spain for the past five seasons from 2014-2019.  She has played for Gernika Bizkaia, Mann-Filter, and Uni Ferrol.

She made her Great Britain Senior debut in 2010 against Portugal.  She has played with the senior team ever since, participating in Eurobasket 2011, the London Olympics 2012, Eurobasket 2013, Eurobasket Qualifiers 2014, Eurobasket 2015, Eurobasket Qualifiers 2016, Eurobasket Qualifiers 2018 and most recently Eurobasket 2019 where Team GB placed 4th and received a bid to the 2020 Tokyo Olympic qualifiers. She received her 50th cap in the London Olympics against Brazil. She received her 100th cap playing against and officially announced her retirement on October 5th 2022. She has 118 caps and prior to finishing her career, she married fellow GB player Eilidh Simpson two months earlier then moved to Australia and got a dog called Moose.

Boston University statistics 

Source

References

1983 births
Living people
British women's basketball players
Boston University Terriers women's basketball players
Basketball players at the 2012 Summer Olympics
Olympic basketball players of Great Britain
Point guards
English people of German descent
British expatriate basketball people in Spain
Basketball players at the 2018 Commonwealth Games
Commonwealth Games medallists in basketball
Commonwealth Games silver medallists for England
Medallists at the 2018 Commonwealth Games